The following lists events that have happened in 1833 in the Qajar dynasty, Iran.

Incumbents
 Monarch: Fat′h-Ali Shah Qajar

Death
 October 25 – Crown Prince Abbas Mirza died in Mashhad, Iran.

References

 
Iran
Years of the 19th century in Iran
1830s in Iran
Iran